The Battle of Young's House was a skirmish fought outside New York City between British and American forces on February 3, 1780 during the American Revolutionary War.  A British force attacked and destroyed a Continental Army outpost in Westchester County, New York.

Background
Following the British Army's successful occupation of New York City in 1776, the second year of the American Revolutionary War, the areas surrounding the city that were between the American and British lines became a no man's land.  These areas, which included Westchester County, New York and Greenwich, Connecticut, were frequently the site of raiding actions between the combatants.  At the end of 1779 this no man's land included Tarrytown and White Plains.  The American lines were not far north of this area, extending into Mount Pleasant.  An outpost at Four Corners (in the present-day Thornwood section of Mount Pleasant) occupied particularly advantageous ground, and its occupation was more than once disputed.  The outpost was on the property of Joseph Young, a local landowner; his house and barns were occupied by Continental Army troops beginning in August 1776.  In December 1778 a British raid captured the small garrison posted there.  They burned a barn but did not occupy the post, and it was promptly reoccupied by Continental Army troops in early 1779.

Prelude
Possibly in retaliation for a raid in January 1780 by the Americans against a British outpost at Kingsbridge, the British decided to make a raid on the outpost at Young's House. On the night of February 2, 1780, Lieutenant Colonel Chapple Norton and a mixed force left the heights near Fort Knyphausen (as the British called Fort Washington). The force consisted of four flank companies from the 1st and 2nd Brigade of Guards, 100 Hessians from two regiments stationed at Kingsbridge, a company of 40 mounted Loyalist led by James DeLancey, and parties of mounted and unmounted Hessian jägers, numbering in total between five and six hundred men. They brought with them two small field pieces, and set out in sleighs owing to deep snow. However, both the sleighs and the field pieces were left behind when it was found that the men moved more quickly on foot.

The outpost at Young's house was the central point for a garrison that guarded a portion of the American line extending about  westward toward the Hudson River and a slightly longer distance to the east.  The 250-man garrison consisted of five companies drawn from the Massachusetts 1st, 3rd, 9th, 14th, and 15th Regiments, and were under the overall command of Lieutenant Colonel Joseph Thompson.  Captains Stoddard and Roberts of the 15th and 1st were stationed to the west, Captain-Lieutenant Farley of the 9th and Captain Cooper of the 14th were stationed to the east, and Captain Watson of the 3rd was with Thompson at the house.  Shortly before the British arrived, a local man warned Thompson that a large number of British were on the way.  Thompson apparently discounted the reported size of the force, since he only sent out messengers to recall the four companies out on guard duty.

Battle
The first encounter between the two sides was between the vanguard of the British force and a picket guard consisting of a sergeant and his squad.  The picket engaged the British, but was quickly overwhelmed by the horsemen and captured.  The British cavalry then rode on toward the house, where Captain Roberts and his company had already arrived and taken up a position on the house's right.  After exchange fire at long range, the cavalry halted to wait for the infantry, which arrived at about the same time as Captain-Lieutenant Farley's company; the companies of Stoddard and Cooper did not arrive in time to participate.  A hot fire then began between the three American companies and the British force which lasted about 15 minutes.  The numerically superior British flanked the Americans and successfully occupied the orchard that was behind the house.  Roberts was mortally wounded, and the American line broke, with some men fleeing into the house, while others tried to escape into the countryside.  The men in the house held out a little longer, but the British infantry forced their way in and captured the surviving occupants, while the cavalry chased down stragglers outside.

Aftermath
The British set fire to the house and its attached buildings, even though there were five wounded Americans inside.  The prisoners, numbering 76, included Lieutenant Colonel Thompson, Captain Watson, and Captain-Lieutenant Farley, and 17 wounded men were left behind.  The prisoners were taken to Kingsbridge.

Sources disagree whether Joseph Young was present during the battle.  Some historians claim that he was taken prisoner in the December 1778 raid, while others suggest he was not captured until this action.

Notes

References 

Bolton, Robert. A history of the county of Westchester, vol 1 (local geography, property description)
Comstock, Sarah (1914-07-19). On Old Saw Mill River Road, New York Times (describes where property is in more modern terms—on road between Sleepy Hollow and North White Plains)
Schwab, John Christopher. The revolutionary history of Fort Number Eight on Morris Heights, New York City

1780 in the United States
Young's House
Young's House
Young's House
Young's House
Mount Pleasant, New York
Young's House
1780 in New York (state)